The Elbląg tram system is the tram network in Elbląg, Poland. Elbląg's tram network is the second oldest tram system in Poland (after Warsaw's).

Lines 

 1: Ogólna – Druska
 2: Marymoncka – Druska
 3: Ogólna – Saperów
 4: Ogólna – Druska
 5: Ogólna – Saperów (summer & winter break - out of service)

Rolling stock

Historic trams:

Elblag
Elbląg
Metre gauge railways in Poland
Elblag